Minister for Community Services is a position in the government of Western Australia, currently held by Simone McGurk of the Labor Party. The position was first created after the 1943 state election, for the government of John Willcock. It was abolished in 1947 and not recreated until 1971, but has existed in most governments since then. The minister is one of the ministers responsible for the state government's Department of Local Government and Communities.

Between 1986 and 2001 there was a separate minister titled either Minister for the Family or Minister for Family and Children's Services, whose responsibilities are now held by the Minister for Community Services.

List of community services ministers
Titles
 9 December 1943 – 1 April 1947: Minister for Social Services
 3 March 1971 – 25 February 1983: Minister for Community Welfare
 25 February 1983 – 7 September 1992: Minister for Community Services
 7 September 1992 – 13 December 2006: Minister for Community Development
 13 December 2006 – 23 September 2008: Minister for Communities
 23 September 2008 – present: Minister for Community Services

List of family ministers
Titles
 25 February 1986 – 29 June 1995: Minister for the Family
 29 June 1995 – 16 February 2001: Minister for Family and Children's Services

See also
 Minister for Child Protection (Western Australia)
 Minister for Disability Services (Western Australia)
 Minister for Health (Western Australia)
 Minister for Housing (Western Australia)
 Minister for Local Government (Western Australia)

References
 David Black (2014), The Western Australian Parliamentary Handbook (Twenty-Third Edition). Perth [W.A.]: Parliament of Western Australia.

Community
Minister for Community